Donald McKenzie (16 June 1783 – 20 January 1851) was a Scottish-Canadian explorer, fur trader and Governor of the Red River Colony from 1821 to 1834.

Early life 
Born in Scotland, McKenzie emigrated to Canada about 1800. He and 2 or three of his brothers became involved in the fur trade and were engaged with the North West Company. In 1810, he left the employ of the North West Company to become a partner in the Pacific Fur Company (PFC), financed solely by John Jacob Astor.

Pacific Fur Company 
McKenzie traveled west from St. Louis, Missouri, to the Pacific Northwest with an expedition of fellow PFC employees. The group divided after experiencing hard times in southern Idaho. McKenzie’s fraction, consisting of twelve total, struck north, eventually finding the Salmon River and Clearwater River. They proceeded down the lower Snake River and Columbia River by canoe, and were the first of the Overland Astorians to reach Fort Astoria, on January 18, 1812.

McKenzie spent two years exploring and trading for the Pacific Fur Company in the Willamette Valley, along the Columbia River, in eastern Washington and in northern and central Idaho. When the PFC sold its assets and stations to the North West Company in 1813, McKenzie was appointed to carry all important papers back east, which he did in 1814.

Fort Nez Percés and Idaho explorations 
After a short time, McKenzie became reacquainted with the North West Company, and returned to the Columbia region in 1816. In 1818, he and Alexander Ross built Fort Nez Percés near the confluence of the Columbia River and Walla Walla River. McKenzie and his trappers made the first extensive exploration of what is now southern Idaho starting in 1818, with annual expeditions continuing through 1821. His trapping ventures covered most of present-day southern Idaho as well as parts of eastern Oregon, northern Utah and western Wyoming. Many of the names for rivers in this region can be traced to this period.

Governor of the Red River Colony 
With the merger of the North West Company and Hudson's Bay Company in 1821, McKenzie was appointed Governor of the Red River Colony. He left the Pacific Northwest and moved to Fort Garry for a decade, serving as governor of the area including most of present-day Manitoba, Saskatchewan, and Alberta, Canada.

Legacy 
In 1834, McKenzie retired and moved to Mayville, New York, where he lived for the next two decades. Among the distinguished visitors McKenzie entertained and advised were Daniel Webster and William H. Seward, both of whom later served as United States Secretary of State. He gave advice on where the international boundary should be established for Oregon, and also may have planted the seeds that led to the purchase of Alaska from Russia. McKenzie Pass and the McKenzie River in Oregon are named for him.

References 
 
 Manitoba Historical Society - Donald McKenzie

External links 
 Journal of Alexander Ross: Snake Country Expedition, 1824; from Quarterly of the Oregon Historical Society, Vol. 14, p. 366 (Dec. 1913)
 Map Showing Route of Overland Astorians 1810-1813
 Photograph of: Donald McKenzie & Adelgonda Humbert Droz

Scottish explorers of North America 
Explorers of Canada
1783 births
1851 deaths
North West Company people
History of the Pacific Northwest
Explorers of Oregon
British emigrants to Canada
Canadian emigrants to the United States
People from Mayville, New York